British guitarist and singer-songwriter Eric Clapton's recording career as a solo album artist began in 1970, with the release of his self-titled debut, Eric Clapton. His second effort, 461 Ocean Boulevard, reached the top of the American album chart and the top ten in several other countries. 

Since then, he has released several best selling albums, such as Unplugged (1992), From the Cradle (1994), and Clapton Chronicles: The Best of Eric Clapton (1999). He has also recorded several albums with other musicians and contributed guitar to a number of songs by popular artists.

Studio albums

Live albums

Compilation albums

Collaborative studio and live albums

Soundtrack albums

Other appearances

Contributions to albums by other artists 
Albums that Clapton contributed to four or more songs.

Guest appearances

See also
The Yardbirds discography
John Mayall discography
Cream discography
Blind Faith discography
Derek and the Dominos discography
Eric Clapton and Jimmy PageBlues Anytime
Eric Clapton and the PowerhouseWhat's Shakin'
Plastic Ono BandLive Peace in Toronto 1969
Delaney & Bonnie & FriendsOn Tour with Eric Clapton
Eric Clapton videography
List of awards and nominations received by Eric Clapton

References

Bibliography

External links

Discography
Rock music discographies
Blues discographies
Discographies of British artists